Paradiceros is an extinct genus of rhinoceros that lived in east Africa during the Late Miocene, between 10.5 and 9 million years ago.

Paradiceros was a relatively small species once believed to be closely allied to Diceros. It was a browser and had very short legs, though not as short as some of the more primitive species like ''Chilotherium.

References

Miocene mammals of Africa
Miocene rhinoceroses